Al Fardan Residences, also known as the Barjeel Tower and the Wind Tower, is a 64-storey residential skyscraper in West Bay, Doha, Qatar. At 254 metres (830 feet), it is the second tallest completed building in Doha. Each of the storeys is 4.1 metres (13.5 feet), each built with 94 "SKE 50 automatic climbers", in a 3 to 4-day cycle. Construction began in 2006 and was completed in 2009.

References

Skyscrapers in Doha
Residential buildings completed in 2009
2009 establishments in Qatar
Residential skyscrapers